The 2006 Shelbourne Irish Open was a men's tennis tournament played on outdoor carpet courts. It was the 1st edition of the event, and part of the 2006 ATP Challenger Series of the 2006 ATP Tour. It took place at the tennis courts at the Fitzwilliam Lawn Tennis Club in Dublin, Ireland, from 3 through 9 July 2006.

Points and prize money

Point distribution

Prize money

* per team

Singles main draw entrants

Seeds

Other entrants
The following players received wildcards into the singles main draw:
  Peter Clarke
  Conor Niland
  Stephen Nugent
  Kevin Sorensen

The following players received entry from the qualifying draw:
  Jean-François Bachelot
  Lee Childs
  Jonathan Marray
  Orest Tereshchuk

Doubles main draw entrants

Seeds

Other entrants
The following pairs received wildcards into the doubles main draw:
  Peter Clarke /  Stephen Nugent
  James Cluskey /  James McGee
  Conor Niland /  Kevin Sorensen

Champions

Singles

  Mischa Zverev defeated  Kristian Pless, 7–5, 7–6(8–6)

Doubles

  Jasper Smit /  Martijn van Haasteren defeated  Colin Fleming /  Jamie Murray, 6–3, 2–6, [10–8]

References

External links
Official Results Archive (ATP)

 Singles Draw (ATP)

 Doubles Draw (ATP)

Irish Open